Tuvera is a surname. Notable people with the surname include:
Kerima Polotan Tuvera (1925–2011), Filipino fiction writer, essayist, and journalist
Voltaire Tuvera Gazmin (born 1944), retired Filipino soldier